Darrell Wilson (born July 28, 1958) is an American football coach who is the defensive coordinator for the Wagner Seahawks football team. Prior to Wagner, Wilson accrued seventeen years of experience at three Big Ten Conference.

Playing career 
A former honorable mention Division I-AA All-America defensive back for Connecticut (1976–80), Wilson was named to the Huskies' 100th-anniversary all-time team in 1998. He played one year with the New England Patriots (1981) and five seasons (1982-86) with the CFL's Toronto Argonauts. He was a member of the 1983 squad that won the CFL's Grey Cup.

Coaching career 
Darrell Wilson has spent 16 seasons coaching in the Big Ten (11 at Iowa, two at Wisconsin, three at Rutgers), while having over 20 years of coaching experience.

Before his collegiate coaching career began, Darrell Wilson compiled a 65-18 record as head coach at Woodrow Wilson High School in Camden, N.J. (1988–95). His teams won five conference championships and four times advanced to the South Jersey Group 3 state finals. Along with the outstanding success of his teams on the football field, Wilson was named Camden's "Citizen of the Year" by the Rotary Club in 1992.

Darrell Wilson's first collegiate coaching position was at Rhode Island (1996–98), where he coached the secondary and wide receivers. He then coached running backs at Rutgers (1999).

Wilson joined the Iowa staff after serving as outside linebacker coach and special teams coordinator at Wisconsin for two years (2000–01). While at Iowa, Wilson coached special teams and outside linebackers in his first six seasons. He then worked with all the linebacker positions and special teams for the four seasons. In 2012, Wilson took over coaching the secondary while assisting with special teams.

He was named by Rivals.com in Feb. 2011 as one of the top 25 recruiters in the nation, primarily recruiting New Jersey, Maryland and Pennsylvania. Under Wilson's coaching, Iowa ranked among national leaders in interceptions in under Wilson's watch. The Hawkeyes collected 10 interceptions in 2012, returning two of those for touchdowns. Cornerback Micah Hyde was honored with the Tatum-Woodson Defensive Back of the Year award, presented by the Big Ten, while earning First-team All-Big Ten honors. Throughout Wilson's tenure, Iowa won 89 games during his tenure, with 52 Big Ten victories. While at Iowa, the program participated in 10 bowl games with six taking place in January. The Hawkeyes finished ranked in the final top 10 of both major polls four times in his 11 seasons.

Wilson then coached at Rutgers (2013-2015) as the defensive backs coach. In 2013, Wilson helped develop a unit that saw five freshmen start at cornerback. At Rutgers, Wilson primarily recruited New Jersey, Maryland, and Pennsylvania.

References

1958 births
Living people
UConn Huskies football players
New England Patriots players
Toronto Argonauts players
Rhode Island Rams football coaches
Rutgers Scarlet Knights football coaches
Wisconsin Badgers football coaches
Iowa Hawkeyes football coaches